Mohamed Abdelghani Faouzi (born July 13, 1985) is a former Moroccan footballer who last played for RAC Casablanca.

Club career
Faouzi started playing football on the streets of his village, Al Attaouia (El Kelaa des Sraghna). There, he was spotted by scouts from Wydad Casablanca who brought him to the club. During his time with Wydad, he was loaned out to JS Massira.

Ittihad
On January 31, 2012, Faouzi was loaned out by Vitória to Saudi Arabian club Ittihad FC for six months with a buy option. On February 7, he made his debut for Ittihad as a starter in a league match against Al-Raed. The player shines as Alittihad has been qualified to the quarter final of Asian Champions League. He scored 3 goals and made 3 Assists and 2 penalties for his team in 7 matches to be the best player in the team during the Asian Champions League.

References

External links

1985 births
Living people
Footballers from Casablanca
Moroccan footballers
Moroccan expatriate footballers
Wydad AC players
Vitória S.C. players
Ittihad FC players
Al-Khor SC players
Moghreb Tétouan players
Olympique Club de Khouribga players
Ittihad Tanger players
Hassania Agadir players
Chabab Rif Al Hoceima players
Racing de Casablanca players
Saudi Professional League players
Qatar Stars League players
Botola players
Primeira Liga players
Association football wingers
Expatriate footballers in Saudi Arabia
Expatriate footballers in Qatar
Expatriate footballers in Portugal
Moroccan expatriate sportspeople in Saudi Arabia
Moroccan expatriate sportspeople in Qatar
Moroccan expatriate sportspeople in Portugal
21st-century Moroccan people